NA-216 Tharparkar-II is a constituency for the National Assembly of Pakistan.

Members of Parliament

2018-2022: NA-222 Tharparkar-II

Election 2002 

General elections were held on 10 Oct 2002. Arbab Ghulam Rahim of National Alliance won by 86,196 votes.

Election 2008 

General elections were held on 18 Feb 2008. Arbab Zakaullah of PML-Q won by 135,697 votes.

Election 2013 

General elections were held on 11 May 2013. Mr. Faqir Sher Muhammad Bilaiani of PPP won the seat and became the member of National Assembly.

Election 2018 

General elections were held on 25 July 2018. This constituency had a highest total turnout in all of Pakistan.

See also
NA-215 Tharparkar-I
NA-217 Matiari

References

External links 
Election result's official website

NA-229
Tharparkar District